Manisha Shah is an economist, as well as Vice-Chair and Professor of Public Policy at the UCLA Luskin School of Public Affairs. She received her PhD in economics from the University of California, Berkeley in agricultural and resource economics in 2006. Additionally, she is the Founding Director of the Global Lab for Research in Action, an editor at the Journal of Health Economics as well as a Faculty Research Associate at the National Bureau of Economic Research, a Research Fellow at the Institute for the Study of Labor, and a Faculty Affiliate at the Abdul Latif Jameel Poverty Action Lab.

Education and career 
Manisha Shah received her B.A. in Economics and Development Studies from University of California at Berkeley in 1995. From there she moved to the London School of Economics, completing her Master's degree in Development Studies in 1997. She then returned to Berkeley for a M.S. in Agricultural & Resource Economics in 2003, followed by a PhD in Agricultural & Resource Economics in 2006.

Following her PhD, Shah was a lecturer in the University of Melbourne Department of Economics from 2006 to 2009. In 2009, she moved to UC Irvine as an Assistant Professor, as well as a Visiting Assistant Professor at Princeton University's Center for Health & Wellbeing. In 2013, she was hired as an Assistant Professor in UCLA's Department of Public Policy. In 2014, she was promoted to Associate Professor, followed by promotion to full Professor in 2018.

Research and academic work 

Shah's work has focused on sex work in both developing countries and the United States.  Her study Risky Business: The Market for Unprotected Sex with Paul Gertler and Stefano Bertozzi was published in 2005 in the Journal of Political Economy. The study focused on how beauty and willingness to have unprotected sex affected the bargaining power and earnings of sex workers in Mexico.

Shah made other contributions to our understanding of beauty's role in the organization of sex markets.  For instance, in The Prostitute's Allure: The Return to Beauty in Commercial Sex Markets published with Raj Arunachalam in 2012 in B.E. Journal of Economic Analysis & Policy, Shah showed further evidence that beauty was economically valued in illicit sex markets in Ecuador and Mexico.

Her work has also challenged a common claim in economics that female sex workers are compensated relatively well for their low-skilled labor because they are sacrificing value in marriage prospects by engaging in sex work. In a 2008 paper in the American Econimc Review: Papers & Proceedings Shah and Arunachalam provide evidence that in a sample of sex workers from Ecuador and Mexico, sex workers were more likely to be married than non-sex workers at younger ages.

Shah has studied the effect of regulation and suppression of sex workers on various women's health outcomes including domestic violence and sexually transmitted infections in order to develop more effective policies and programs to combat such negative outcomes. In a 2011 paper, Gertler and Shah found that enforcing street prostitution regulations reduces STIs among street prostitutes.  But, increasing enforcement in the brothel sector increases the chances that a sex worker will ever be infected with an STI, suggesting that enforcement has mixed impacts on STI dynamics depending on the target of the regulations.  Cunningham and Shah followed this theme with a historical study of a decriminalization of indoor sex work in Rhode Island in 2003. Here they found that the decriminalization of indoor sex work caused a 30% reduction in reported rapes and a 40% reduction in female gonorrhea incidence. The authors suggest these changes were due to increased services available to now-legitimized sex workers, as well as potential sex offenders turning to sex workers over sexual violence due to the decreased monetary and social cost of patronizing sex workers.

Shah has also contributed to our understanding of the way in which internet technology improves the functioning of male sex markets.  In a 2013 paper, Logan and Shah noted that internet sex markets allowed potential sex workers and clients to engage in signalling, sharing photographs with certain clients to convey safety and in return receive higher earnings.

Shah was also co-editor of the Oxford University Press Handbook for the Economics of Prostitution with Scott Cunningham in 2016. She also serves as an Associate Editor for The Review of Economics and Statistics.

Shah has made contributions to the relationship between people's risky behaviors and natural disasters. In March 2014, Manisha Shah and Lisa Cameron, published a paper: Risk-Taking Behavior in the Wake of Natural Disasters. This paper proposes "while experiencing natural disasters, people usually tend to be more risk-averse than usual".

Shah's work has also been supported by a number of foundations and institutions. These include, but are not limited to, the World Bank, the Bill and Melinda Gates Foundation, the William and Flora Hewlett Foundation, and the National Science Foundation.

References

Year of birth missing (living people)
Living people
American economists
UCLA Luskin School of Public Affairs faculty
University of California, Berkeley alumni